is the mayor of Sendai, Miyagi in Japan. Upon graduation from the University of Tokyo in 1978, he joined the Ministry of International Trade and Industry. After leaving the ministry in 2005, he was elected mayor of Sendai in the same year.

References

External links
 Katsuhiko Umehara, Mayor, City of Sendai, Japan

Mayors of Sendai
1954 births
Living people
People from Sendai
Japanese government officials
University of Tokyo alumni